The 2002 National AFL Under 18 Championships was the seventh edition of the AFL Under 18 Championships. Eight teams competed in the championships: Vic Metro, Vic Country, South Australia and Western Australia in Division 1, and New South Wales/Australian Capital Territory (NSW/ACT), Northern Territory, Queensland and Tasmania in Division 2. The competition was played over three rounds across two divisions. Vic Metro and NSW/ACT were the Division 1 and Division 2 champions, respectively. The Michael Larke Medal (for the best player in Division 1) was awarded to South Australia's Byron Schammer, and the Hunter Harrison Medal (for the best player in Division 2) was won by the Northern Territory's Anthony Corrie.

Results

Division 1

Division 2

Under 18 All-Australian team
The 2002 Under 18 All-Australian team was named on 6 July 2002:

 South Australia: Daniel Bell, Adam Cooney, David Kellett, Byron Schammer
 Victoria Country: James Allan, Ryley Dunn, Matthew Ferguson, Adam Fisher, Brendon Goddard, Troy Selwood
 Victoria Metro: Stephen Gilham, Paul Johnson, Steven Salopek, Kade Simpson, Callum Urch
 Western Australia: Matthew Moody
 New South Wales/Australian Capital Territory: Ryan Crawford
 Northern Territory: Jared Brennan, Raphael Clarke, Anthony Corrie
 Queensland: Paul Shelton
 Tasmania: Luke Shackleton
 Coach: David Dickson (Vic Metro)
 Assistant coach: Darren Trevena (Northern Territory)

References

Under 18